The Zhiben Hot Spring is a hot spring in Beinan, Taitung County, Taiwan. It is one of the most famous Taiwanese hot springs.

History 
The Puyuma people, which inhabited in the area, learned that the Zhiben Hot Spring was healthy to the human body. During the Japanese rule era, the government set up public baths using water from the hot spring. On 8 August 2009 Zhiben was one of many places in Taiwan to be badly hit by Typhoon Morakot (2009) and made international news headlines when an eyewitness filmed the collapse of a riverside hotel undermined by flood waters. However, Zhiben's infrastructure was very rapidly restored and as of autumn 2009 the main spas are once more operational and easy to reach from Taitung City.

References

Hot springs of Taitung County